Captain Russell Thomas Harmer (5 November 1896 – 31 October 1940) was a British sailor who competed in the 1936 Summer Olympics.

He was the son of Sidney Frederic Harmer, the British zoologist. He was educated at Uppingham School and the Royal Military Academy, Woolwich. In 1915 he joined the Royal Corps of Signals. During World War 1, he was wounded in action and reached the rank of Captain.

Post-war, he joined the family business selling wholesale clothing. In 1936 he was one of the four crew members of the British boat Lalage which won the gold medal in the 6 metre class. All four were members of the Royal Corinthian Yacht Club.

He died on 31 October 1940 in Norwich after a long illness.

References

External links
 
 
 

1896 births
1940 deaths
British male sailors (sport)
Olympic sailors of Great Britain
Sailors at the 1936 Summer Olympics – 6 Metre
Olympic gold medallists for Great Britain
Olympic medalists in sailing

Medalists at the 1936 Summer Olympics
People educated at Uppingham School